The ТE3 (Russian: ТЭ3) is a Soviet diesel-electric locomotive, built in Russia and Ukraine to 1520 mm gauge. It is a two-unit Co’Co’+Co’Co’ machine. They were built from 1953 to 1973.

Powertrain

The TE3 is powered by two Kharkiv 2D100 prime movers. Transmission is diesel electric.

Numbering
Each pair of locomotives was numbered: 001–598, 1001–1404, 2001–7805, making a total of 6807 pairs or 13,614 units. The information box shows 6808 pairs and 13,617 units. The reason for the discrepancy is not known. Possibly 3 spare units were built to cover for failures.

References

Co-Co+Co-Co locomotives
Railway locomotives introduced in 1953
Diesel-electric locomotives of Ukraine
Diesel-electric locomotives of Russia
Diesel-electric locomotives of the Soviet Union
Luhanskteplovoz locomotives
5 ft gauge locomotives